American violinist Lindsey Stirling has released six studio albums, two extended plays, one video album, eighteen singles, and 87 music videos.

Studio albums

EPs 
 Lindsey Stomp (2010)
 Lose You Now (2021)

Video releases 
 Lindsey Stirling: Live from London (2015)

Singles

Collaborative singles 
2011: "By No Means" (with Eppic)
2011: "Party Rock Anthem" LMFAO cover (with Jake Bruene and Frank Sacramone)
2012: "Starships", Nicki Minaj cover (with Megan Nicole)
2012: "Grenade", Bruno Mars cover (with Alex Boye and the Salt Lake Pops)
2013: "1 Original, ONE Cover" – "Some Kind of Beautiful" and "Thrift Shop" (with Tyler Ward)
2013: "Living Room Sessions" – "Daylight" and "I Knew You Were Trouble" (with Tyler Ward and Chester See)
2013: "Mission Impossible" (with The Piano Guys)
2013: "Radioactive", Imagine Dragons cover (with Pentatonix)
2013: "Star Wars Medley" (with Peter Hollens)
2013: "All of Me" (with John Legend)
2014: "Papaoutai" (with Pentatonix)
2014: "Beautiful Times" (with Owl City)
2014: "Loud" (with Jessie J)
2015: "Sounds Like Heaven" (with Marina Kaye)
2015: "Pure Imagination" (with Josh Groban and The Muppets)
2015: "Les Misérables Medley", covers
2015: "Hallelujah" (with Joy Enriquez)
2016: "Dying for You" (with Otto Knows and Alex Aris)
2016: "The Show Must Go On" (with Celine Dion)
2018: "Hi-Lo" (with Evanescence)
2018: "Stampede" (with Alexander Jean)
2019: “Voices” (with Switchfoot)
2020: We Are Warriors (with Avril Lavigne)
2020: Use My Voice  (with Evanescence)
2020: “Invincible” (with Escape the Fate)
2021: “Warbringer” (with TheFatRat)

Music videos

TV and film soundtrack appearances
Lindsey Stirling music appearances on television and in movies:

References 

Discographies of American artists
Electronic music discographies
Classical music discographies